James Hamilton, 7th Earl of Abercorn  PC (Ire) (1686–1744), styled Lord Paisley from 1701 to 1734, was a Scottish and Irish nobleman and peer. An amateur scientist and musician, he published a book on magnetism in 1729 and a treatise on musical harmony in 1730, which was subsequently emended and re-issued by his teacher, Dr. Pepusch.

Birth and origins 
James was born on 22 March 1686, the second but eldest surviving son of James Hamilton and his wife Elizabeth Reading. His father was at the time the representant of a cadet branch of the Earls of Abercorn that descended from George Hamilton, 1st Baronet of Donalong, the fourth son of the 1st Earl but wou;ld later succeed a cousin as the 6th Earl of Abercorn. The Abercorn Hamiltons had come from Scotland to Ireland during the Plantation of Ulster.

James's mother was the only surviving child of Sir Robert Reading, 1st Baronet, of Dublin. His parents were Protestants. They had married in January 1684. He was one of 14 siblings, who are listed in his father's article.

Early life 
While James Hamilton was a young child, his father fought for King William in the Williamite War in Ireland and brought provisions to Derry just before the Siege of Derry.

In 1701 the main line of the Abercorns failed when Charles Hamilton, 5th Earl of Abercorn died childless in Strabane, Ireland. Charles's nearest living male relative was Hamilton's father, Charles's second cousin (see Family tree). His father therefore succeeded as the 6th Earl of Abercorn, and Hamilton, aged 15, became the new Earl's heir apparent with the courtesy title of Lord Paisley. At the same time as Earl of Abercorn in Scotland, his father succeeded as the 7th Baron of Strabane in Ireland. About six months later, on 2 December 1701, his father, Lord Abercorn, was rewarded with the new Irish titles. The King advanced him from Baron Strabane to Viscount Strabane and gave him the additional subsidiary title of Baron Mountcastle.

Marriage and children 
In April 1711, Lord Paisley, as he now was, married Anne Plumer (1690–1776), daughter of Colonel John Plumer of Ware, Hertfordshire.

 
James and Anne had six sons and two daughters:
 James (1712–1789), succeeded him as 8th Earl of Abercorn
 John (c. 1714 – 1755), Captain in the Royal Navy, father of the John Hamilton, 1st Marquess of Abercorn
 William, died young
 Anne (1715–1792), married Sir Henry Mackworth, 6th Baronet and had issue
 George (1718–1787), Canon of Windsor, married Elizabeth Onslow (d. 1800), daughter of Lieutenant-General Richard Onslow
 Plumer Hamilton, died young
 William (1721–1744), lost in HMS Victory off Alderney.
A daughter (born 1736), died an infant

Scientific studies 
On 10 November 1715 Lord Paisley was elected a Fellow of the Royal Society.

Lord Paisley was a Freemason and was Grand Master of the Premier Grand Lodge of England during 1725–1726.

In 1729 he published a short treatise entitled Calculations and Tables Relating to the Attractive Virtue of Loadstones (according to the catalogue of the British Library), which presents the results of experiments he had made with lodestones (natural permanent magnets) of various sizes, each time measuring the mass of the loadstone and the weight of iron with which it can be armed, or that it can hold on its surfaces.

Lord Paisley also studied music, taking lessons from Johann Christoph Pepusch, a well-known musician in his time. In 1730 he published, based on Pepusch's teaching, anonymously and without his teacher's assent a booklet entitled "A Short Treatise on Harmony". Understandably, the teacher felt offended. As the book was not well written and lacked illustrations in musical notes, he was concerned about his reputation as his connection to the book would certainly be discovered. He, therefore, helped to prepare a second improved edition published in 1731. In this form the book exposed and documented the practice of the best composers of the period. Paisley was still in friendly connection with his teachers as Pepusch visited Paisley at his seat in Witham, Essex in 1733.

Father's succession 
Lord Paisley succeeded as the 7th Earl of Abercorn at his father's death in 1734. In Ireland, he succeeded as the 2nd Viscount Strabane.

Lord Abercorn was sworn a Privy Counsellor in Great Britain on 20 July 1738. He was appointed to the Privy Counsellor in Ireland in July 1737 but was sworn only on 26 September 1739 when he came to Ireland.

On 17 October of that same year, George II issued a royal charter to the nation's first orphanage for abandoned children, the Foundling Hospital, of which Abercorn was one of the many founding governors.

Death and timeline 
Abercorn died on 11 January 1744 at Cavendish Square, western London, and was buried five days later in the Ormonde vault of the Henry VII Chapel of Westminster Abbey where his father had already been laid to rest.

Notes and references

Notes

Citations

Sources 

  – Marriages, baptisms and burials from about 1660 to 1875
  – 1665 to 1707
  – Ab-Adam to Basing
  – (for timeline)
 
 
  – Abercorn to Balmerino
  – Viscounts (for Strabane)

 
 

 

 

 

1686 births
1744 deaths
07
Fellows of the Royal Society
Members of the Privy Council of Ireland
Members of the Privy Council of Great Britain
Grand Masters of the Premier Grand Lodge of England
Freemasons of the Premier Grand Lodge of England